Nodaway-Holt R-VII School District is a school district headquartered in Graham, Missouri, and has Graham, Maitland, and Skidmore in its attendance boundary. It operates an elementary school in Maitland and a junior-senior high school in Graham, with the latter including the district headquarters.

Its previous high school building was built in 1938. In 2019 a new high school building was established. The district planned to demolish the 1938 facility on June 8, 2020.

The current high school building was scheduled to open in 2019.

Skidmore, Maitland, and Graham consolidated into Nodaway-Holt in 1968. K-3 was located in Skidmore, 4-8 in Maitland and 9-12 in Graham. The Skidmore building was later closed and the current building configuration of K-6 in Maitland and 7-12 in Graham was adopted.

Demographics
There were 22 students in the Class of 2000.

Athletics
In 2020 the West Nodaway School District agreed to enter into a sports cooperative program with Nodaway-Holt.

References

External links
 Nodaway-Holt R-VII School District

School districts in Missouri
Holt County, Missouri
Education in Nodaway County, Missouri